Joseph Esherick may refer to:
Joseph Esherick (architect) (1914–1998), American architect
Joseph W. Esherick, professor of modern Chinese history at University of California, San Diego

See also
Esherick (disambiguation)